The 2020 FC Kyzylzhar season was Kyzylzhar's the first season back in the Kazakhstan Premier League, the highest tier of association football in Kazakhstan, following their relegation in 2018. Kyzylzhar will also take part in the Kazakhstan Cup.

Season events
On 13 March, the Football Federation of Kazakhstan announced all league fixtures would be played behind closed doors for the foreseeable future due to the COVID-19 pandemic. On 16 March the Football Federation of Kazakhstan suspended all football until 15 April.

On 30 May, the Professional Football League of Kazakhstan announced that Irtysh Pavlodar had withdrawn from the league due to financial issues, with all their matches being excluded from the league results.

On 26 July, it was announced that the league would resume on 1 July, with no fans being permitted to watch the games. The league was suspended for a second time on 3 July, for an initial two weeks, due to an increase in COVID-19 cases in the country.

On 9 September, Kyzylzhar announced the signings of Ruslan Koryan, Nikita Bezlikhotnov and Artem Baranovskyi.

Squad

Transfers

Winter

In:

Out:

Summer

In:

Out:

Friendlies

Competitions

Premier League

Results summary

Results by round

Results

League table

Kazakhstan Cup

Squad statistics

Appearances and goals

|-
|colspan="14"|Players away from Kyzylzhar on loan:
|-
|colspan="14"|Players who left Kyzylzhar during the season:

|}

Goal scorers

Clean sheets

Disciplinary record

References

FC Kyzylzhar seasons
Kyzylzhar